Klimov is a Soviet aircraft engine design bureau. It may also refer to

Klimov (surname)
Klimov Bluff in Antarctica